The 2009 Roewe Shanghai Masters was a professional ranking snooker tournament that took place between 7–13 September 2009 at the Shanghai Grand Stage in Shanghai, China.

Ronnie O'Sullivan won in the final 10–5 against Liang Wenbo.

Prize fund
The breakdown of prize money for this year is shown below:

Winner: £55,000
Runner-up: £28,000
Semi-final: £14,000
Quarter-final: £7,525
Last 16: £5,370
Last 32: £3,640
Last 48: £2,050
Last 64: £1,400

Stage one highest break: £500
Stage two highest break: £2,000
Total: £300,000

Wildcard round
These matches were played in Shanghai on September 7.

Main draw

Final

Qualifying
These matches took place between 3 and 6 August 2009 at the Pontin's Centre, Prestatyn, Wales.

Century breaks

Qualifying stage centuries
138  Dominic Dale
135  Gerard Greene
129, 120  Jordan Brown
127  Martin Gould
126  Mark Davis
118, 113, 102  Xiao Guodong
115  Patrick Wallace
114, 101  Andrew Higginson
113  Graeme Dott
112  Robert Milkins
110, 103  Lee Spick
108  Rod Lawler
105  Bjorn Haneveer
105  Matthew Selt
105  Judd Trump
100  Tony Drago

Televised stage centuries
133, 123, 106  Shaun Murphy
132, 101  Ding Junhui
129  Ken Doherty
128, 104  Matthew Selt
122, 103  Ricky Walden
120, 118  Matthew Stevens
118, 102  Liang Wenbo
111  Ryan Day
110, 101  Tian Pengfei
109, 101, 101  Ronnie O'Sullivan
102  Graeme Dott
101  Mark Williams
101  Stuart Bingham

References

2009
Shanghai Masters
Shanghai Masters
September 2009 sports events in China